Mixto Esporte Clube, usually known simply as Mixto, is a Brazilian football club from Cuiabá, Mato Grosso state. The club competed in the Campeonato Brasileiro Série A several times and is one of the most popular clubs of Mato Grosso state. Mixto is also the most successful football club of Mato Grosso, having won twenty-four Campeonato Matogrossense titles.

History
The club was founded on May 20, 1934, by a mixed group of men and women, hence the club's name, but instead of using the correct spelling Misto, the wrong spelling Mixto was used, to differentiate the club from the misto sandwich.

In 1943, Mixto won the Campeonato Matogrossense first edition. In 1976, the club competed in the Campeonato Brasileiro Série A for the first time, finishing in the 27th position.

Achievements

State competitions
Campeonato Matogrossense: 24
1943, 1945, 1947, 1948, 1949, 1951, 1952, 1953, 1954, 1959, 1961, 1962, 1965, 1969, 1970, 1979, 1980, 1981, 1982, 1984, 1988, 1989,1996, 2008

Copa Governador do Mato Grosso: 1
2012

Torneio Início: 1
1969

Regional competitions
Torneio Centro-Oeste: 1
1976

Campeonato Brasileiro Série A participations
Mixto competed in the Campeonato Brasileiro Série A in 1976, 1978, 1979, 1980, 1981, 1982, 1983, 1985, and 1986. The club's best participation was in 1985, when the club finished in the 14th place.

References

External links
Mixto Esporte Clube's official website

 
Association football clubs established in 1934
1934 establishments in Brazil
Football clubs in Mato Grosso